Middleburg is an unincorporated community in Noble County, in the U.S. state of Ohio.

History
Middleburg was laid out in 1844. An old variant name of Middleburg was Middle Creek. A post office was established in the community as Middle Creek in 1837, and remained in operation until 1905.

References

Unincorporated communities in Noble County, Ohio
Unincorporated communities in Ohio